Megachile yasumatsui is a species of bee in the family Megachilidae. It was described by Hirashima in 1974.

References

Yasumatsui
Insects described in 1974